Progressive Tailors Club, is a Nigerian political satire film directed by Biodun Stephen and co-produced by Niyi Akinmolayan and Victoria Akujobi. The film stars Beverly Osu, Uzor Arukwe, Funnybone, and Blessing Jessica Obasi with Rachael Oniga, Lizzy Jay, Adedimeji Lateef, and Bolaji Ogunmola in supporting roles. The film deals with members of the Progressive Tailors Club where they gather for a meeting to elect their new leader but made several unlawful comments on that.

The film was shot in and around Lagos, Nigeria. It premiered on 29 October 2021.

Cast
 Beverly Osu
 Uzor Arukwe
 Funnybone
 Blessing Jessica Obasi
 Rachel Oniga
 Lizzy Jay
 Adedimeji Lateef
 Bolaji Ogunmola
 Femi Adebayo
 Kolawole Ajeyemi

Plot
Members of the Progressive Tailor’s Club gathered for a meeting to elect their new leader. However, when a longstanding, trusted executive is eliminated for corruption, it comes down to a choice between the old, the new and the ridiculous.

Awards and nominations

References 

English-language Nigerian films
2021 films
2021 drama films
Nigerian film actors
Nigerian Academy of Science
2020s English-language films